Windsurfing has been one of the Olympic sailing events at the Summer Olympics since 1984 for men and 1992 for women.  All sailors use the same One Design boards, daggerboards, fins and sails. The equipment is chosen to allow racing in a wide range of sailing conditions, as during the Olympic Games events must take place as scheduled whether or not there is enough wind for planing.

Years and equipment 
1984 Summer Olympics (Los Angeles): Windglider
1988 Summer Olympics (Seoul): Lechner Division II
1992 Summer Olympics (Barcelona): Lechner
1996 Summer Olympics (Atlanta): Mistral One Design
2000 Summer Olympics (Sydney): Mistral One Design
2004 Summer Olympics (Athens): Mistral One Design
 2004, Men's sailboard, 2004, Women's sailboard,
2008 Summer Olympics (Beijing): Neil Pryde RS:X
 2008, Men's sailboard, 2008, Women's sailboard
2012 Summer Olympics (London): Neil Pryde RS:X
 2012, Men's sailboard, 2012, Women's sailboard
2016 Summer Olympics (Rio): Neil Pryde RS:X
2020 Summer Olympics (Tokyo): Neil Pryde RS:X
2024 Summer Olympics (Paris): IQFoil

Individual windsurfers 
Multiple medal winners include Alessandra Sensini and Barbara Kendall with three medals; and Bruce Kendall (brother of Barbara Kendall) and Dorian van Rijsselberghe with two medals.
See List of Olympic medalists in sailing by class.
Olympic sailboarders are included in :Category:Olympic sailors.

References

Windsurfing at multi-sport events
Sailing at the Summer Olympics